Arimura (written: 有村) is a Japanese surname. Notable people with the surname include:

, Japanese endocrinologist, physiologist and biochemist
, Japanese politician
, Japanese actress
, Japanese footballer
, Japanese radio personality, film critic and film commentator

Japanese-language surnames